Pelago is a comune (municipality) in the Metropolitan City of Florence in the Italian region Tuscany, located about  east of Florence.

The municipality of Pelago contains the frazioni (subdivisions, mainly villages and hamlets) Borselli, Carbonile, Consuma, Diacceto, Fontisterni, Magnale, Palaie, Paterno, Raggioli, San Francesco, and Stentatoio.

Lorenzo Ghiberti was born in Pelago in 1378.

Pelago borders the following municipalities: Montemignaio, Pontassieve, Pratovecchio, Reggello, Rignano sull'Arno, Rufina.

Demographic evolution

References

External links

 www.comune.pelago.fi.it/

Cities and towns in Tuscany